Joana Robles Partida (born 26 July 1994) is a Mexican footballer who plays as an attacking midfielder for Club Atlas and the Mexico women's national team.

International career
Robles made her senior debut for Mexico on 27 February 2019 in a friendly match against Italy.

References

External links 
 

1994 births
Living people
Women's association football midfielders
Mexican women's footballers
Footballers from Jalisco
Mexico women's international footballers
Pan American Games competitors for Mexico
Footballers at the 2019 Pan American Games
Liga MX Femenil players
Mexican footballers